Sacabaya (also known as Tambo Quemado) is a pyroclastic shield in Bolivia. It is located on the Altiplano near to the Rio Lauca. The volcano is composed of ignimbrite, which has formed a shield. The shield is capped by an area of vents which has many overlapping craters, and is elongated in shape. At the southern end lies the youngest of the craters which has a lava dome within it.

Material from the volcano has been transported away by wind. The volcano may be of Holocene age and is presently fumarolically active (GVP).

See also
 List of volcanoes in Bolivia

References

Sources
 

Pyroclastic shields
Subduction volcanoes
Volcanoes of Oruro Department